Peter Andrew Harwood  is a Guernsey lawyer and politician who was the Chief Minister of Guernsey from 1 May 2012 until 25 February 2014.

Harwood was born in Guernsey in 1947, and educated at Elizabeth College, Guernsey and University of Southampton.  He was admitted as an English Solicitor in 1972 and continued in employment in London as a Solicitor and latterly as a Corporate Finance Executive before returning to Guernsey. Called to the Guernsey Bar as an Advocate in 1982, Deputy Harwood served as a partner of law firm Ozannes until the end of 2009 and as a consultant until retirement in December 2011.

Harwood was appointed a Commissioner of the Guernsey Financial Services Commission in 2004 and served as Chairman from 2006 until retirement in January 2012. He was Chairman of the Panel to review Guernsey's Machinery of Government from 1998 to 2000. He is also a founder trustee of the Help a Guernsey Child charity.

Harwood was elected to the States of Deliberation in April 2012 and elected to the position of Chief Minister of Guernsey in May 2012. He resigned as Chief Minister on 25 February 2014.

According to the News published on BBC News, he won a vote of 27-20 against the only other candidate Deputy Jonathan Le Tocq.

Harwood was appointed Officer of the Order of the British Empire (OBE) in the 2022 Birthday Honours for services to Guernsey.

References

1947 births
Government ministers of Guernsey
Living people
Members of the States of Guernsey
Guernsey people
Officers of the Order of the British Empire